The 1987 Tour du Haut Var was the 19th edition of the Tour du Haut Var cycle race and was held on 20–21 February 1987. The race started in Fréjus and finished in Seillans. The race was won by Rolf Gölz.

General classification

References

1987
1987 in road cycling
1987 in French sport